BK Patrioti Levice, commonly known as Levickí Patrioti, is a Slovak basketball team based in Levice. The team currently plays in the national top-tier Slovak Basketball League (SBL).

Honours
Slovak League
Champions (3): 2010–11, 2017–18, 2021-22
Slovak Cup
Champions (1): 2019
Alpe Adria Cup
Champions (1): 2021–22
Runners-up (1): 2017–18

References

External links
Official website

Basketball teams in Slovakia
Basketball teams established in 1941
Levice District
Sport in Nitra Region
1941 establishments in Czechoslovakia
Basketball in Czechoslovakia